Air Bremen was a small German airline based in Bremen operating between 1988 and 1990.

Fleet

The Air Bremen fleet consisted of up to three Saab 340 turboprop aircraft.

References

External links

Defunct airlines of Germany
Airlines established in 1988
Airlines disestablished in 1990
1988 establishments in West Germany
1990 disestablishments in West Germany
Companies based in Bremen